Founders Park, formerly known as Carolina Stadium, is a stadium in Columbia, South Carolina on the banks of the Congaree River. The facility was built for a cost of $35.6 million and is used for college baseball as home to the University of South Carolina Gamecocks baseball team.

Facility overview
The baseball training facilities at the stadium include four indoor batting tunnels, a  weight room, team clubhouse, coaches' offices, and a sports medicine room. Among the numerous amenities for fans, there are five luxury suites and two club-level seating areas with lounges, a Gamecock store just inside the main entrance in the outfield plaza, along with a picnic terrace that accommodates around 120 people down the left-field line. The scoreboard towers  over the left field wall and features a 28-by-16-foot video screen.

The main stadium entrance to Founders Park is located at the northeast corner of the grounds directly behind the center-field wall. Following the 2010 national championship, USC had a mural applied to the backside of its center-field wall (to be viewed as visitors and fans enter onto stadium grounds), celebrating the 2010 CWS Title. In addition, a showcase was built at the base of the wall for the display of the 2010 CWS National Championship Trophy. The mural and trophy case have since been updated to honor both the 2010 and 2011 CWS Championship Teams.

In 2013, the website Stadium Journey ranked Carolina Stadium as the second best Division I baseball venue, and received an average rating 4.6 of 5 stars in 7 categories.

In 2014, the website Stadium Journey ranked Carolina Stadium as the best Division I baseball venue, and received an average rating 4.7 of 5 stars in 7 categories.

In 2015, the facility name was officially changed from Carolina Stadium to Founders Park, becoming only the third college baseball stadium in the United States to earn a corporate sponsorship.

History
The stadium was opened on February 21, 2009, with a 13–0 South Carolina victory over Duquesne with 8,153 fans in attendance, a record crowd for a Gamecock home game. The ceremonial first pitches were thrown by USC President Dr. Harris Pastides and former Gamecock baseball coaches Bobby Richardson and June Raines. Darius Rucker, former lead singer for Hootie and the Blowfish and USC alumnus, sang the National Anthem.

On May 21, 2010, a stadium record crowd of 8,242 attended a game against Florida; the record has been equaled many times since. The highest attendance for a three-game weekend series (24,726) was set from April 15–17, 2011, as the Gamecocks hosted #1 Vanderbilt and won the series two games to one.

Tournaments Hosted 
NCAA Regional Tournaments :  2010, 2011, 2012, 2013, 2014, 2016, 2021

NCAA Super Regional Tournaments : 2011, 2012, 2016, 2021

Key dates

South Carolina Gamecocks' Record in Founders Park (2009–Present) 

Totals only reflect completed seasons

See also 
 List of NCAA Division I baseball venues

References

External links 
Article on new ballpark
USC thrills big crowd with overwhelming win
Carolina Stadium Fact Sheet from The State newspaper 

South Carolina Gamecocks
South Carolina Gamecocks baseball
South Carolina Gamecocks sports venues
Baseball venues in South Carolina
College baseball venues in the United States
Sports venues completed in 2007
Populous (company) buildings